Herb Rowland (18 May 1911 – 14 July 1995) was a Canadian wrestler. He competed in the men's freestyle featherweight at the 1932 Summer Olympics.

References

External links
 

1911 births
1995 deaths
Canadian male sport wrestlers
Olympic wrestlers of Canada
Wrestlers at the 1932 Summer Olympics
Sportspeople from Montreal
20th-century Canadian people